Laurenceomyia is a genus of fossil moth fly in the subfamily Phlebotominae.

Species
†Libanophlebotomus lutfallahi Azar, Nel, Solignac, Paicheler & Bouchet, 1999

References 

Nematocera genera
Diptera of Asia
Psychodidae